Flaibano (locally ) is a comune (municipality) in the Province of Udine in the Italian region Friuli-Venezia Giulia, located about  northwest of Trieste and about  west of Udine.

Flaibano borders the following municipalities: Coseano, Dignano, San Giorgio della Richinvelda, Sedegliano, Spilimbergo.

Twin towns
 Bettembourg, Luxembourg
 Valpaços, Portugal

References

External links
 Official website

Cities and towns in Friuli-Venezia Giulia